Jennifer "Jen" Williams is a British fantasy novelist and short story writer.

Biography
Jennifer Williams lives in southeast London where she works as a bookseller and copywriter. Williams and Den Patrick began a monthly social group for fantasy fans called the Super Relaxed Fantasy Club. Her first three books were nominated for British Fantasy Awards in 2015, 2016 and 2017 respectively and she won the award for Best Fantasy Novel in 2018 and 2019. She has written for various magazines in addition to working on her various novels.

Her latest novel, thriller Dog Rose Dirt, was released in July 2021 by way of HarperFiction, and was distributed as A Dark and Secret Place in the United States with Crooked Lane Books.

Awards

|-
! scope="row" | 2015
| British Fantasy Award 
| Best Fantasy Novel 
| The Copper Promise
| 
| 
|-
! scope="row" | 2016
| British Fantasy Award 
| Best Fantasy Novel 
| The Iron Ghost
| 
| 
|-
! scope="row" | 2017
| British Fantasy Award 
| Best Fantasy Novel 
| The Silver Tide
| 
| 
|-
! scope="row" | 2018
| British Fantasy Award 
| Best Fantasy Novel 
| The Ninth Rain
| 
| 
|-
! scope="row" | 2018
|  Subjective Chaos Kind of Awards
| Best Blurred Boundary 
| The Ninth Rain
| 
| 
|-
! scope="row" | 2019
| British Fantasy Award 
| Best Fantasy Novel 
| The Bitter Twins
| 
| 
|-
! scope="row" | 2020
| Subjective Chaos Kind of Awards
| Best Series 
| The Winnowing Flame
| 
|

Bibliography
The Copper Promise series
The Copper Promise (2014) – 
Sorrow's Isle (2015) – 
The Iron Ghost (2015) – 
The Silver Tide (2016) – 

The Winnowing Flame series
The Ninth Rain (2017) – 
The Bitter Twins (2018) – 
The Poison Song (2019) – 

Other novels
A Dark and Secret Place (2021, UK) –  / Dog Rose Dirt (2021, US) – 

Collection
Her Majesty's Mysterious Conveyance (2012) (with Sean Hayden, Elizabeth Valentino and Nick Valentino) – 

Short fiction
London Stone (2009)
Constance Withers and the Wall (2016)

References

External links 
 
 
 

Living people
Year of birth missing (living people)
Writers from London
21st-century British women writers
Place of birth missing (living people)
21st-century British novelists
British women novelists
British fantasy writers
Women science fiction and fantasy writers